Pärnography is a 2005 Estonian documentary film directed by Hardi Volmer. The film talks about one of the most notable Estonian animator: Priit Pärn.

Awards, nominations, participations:
 2005: Estonian Film Journalists' Association's award: nomination for Neitsi Maali award
 2005: annual award by Cultural Endowment of Estonia (best documentary film of the year)
 2005: Tallinn Black Nights Film Festival (PÖFF), best Estonian film
 2006: Estonian Film Days (Estonia), best documentary film

Plot

References

External links
 
 Pärnography, entry in Estonian Film Database (EFIS)

2005 films
Estonian documentary films
Estonian-language films